James Donald Miller (born February 9, 1971) is a host on SiriusXM NFL Radio, and a former National Football League (NFL) quarterback (1994–2005), best known for his years with the Chicago Bears (1998–2002). Following his professional football career, Miller has worked as a football analyst on radio and television.

Early years
Miller attended Waterford Kettering High School in Waterford, Michigan, and graduated in 1989. He started as the Captain's varsity quarterback his sophomore year and held that position through his senior year. Miller also played baseball and basketball.

College career
Miller was a starting quarterback for the Michigan State Spartans for three years, beginning as a sophomore. As a senior, he led the 1993 Spartans to a 6–5 regular season record, and a berth in the Liberty Bowl, which they lost to Louisville, 18–7. He finished with a final record of 14–24,  and passed for a total of 5037 yards. Miller then played in the 1994 Senior Bowl, passing for 75 yards (7-for-10) and one interception.

Professional career
Miller was drafted in the 6th round of the 1994 NFL Draft by the Pittsburgh Steelers, 178th overall. He broke a thumb in training camp, and missed most of the 1994 season. In the spring of 1995, while still under contract with the Steelers, Miller was assigned to the Frankfurt Galaxy of the World League of American Football in order to get playing time; he played briefly with the Galaxy before suffering a wrist injury. As one of four quarterbacks on the Steelers roster in 1995, Miller would serve as the third-string quarterback behind Neil O'Donnell and Mike Tomczak and ahead of rookie Kordell Stewart, who unlike Miller was active for games under his "Slash" role while Miller was the team's designated emergency quarterback.

Following O'Donnell's departure in free agency in 1996, Miller competed with Tomczak and Stewart for the starting job and won, but was benched midway through the team's first game and Tomczak largely started for the rest of the season, with Miller demoted back to third-string behind Stewart. Miller ultimately appeared in a total of five games with the Steelers, who released him prior to the 1997 regular season in favor of Mike Quinn.

During the 1997 season, Miller was briefly with the Jacksonville Jaguars, before joining the Atlanta Falcons — he did not appear in a game for either team. Miller next signed with the Detroit Lions in March 1998, but was released by the team in August, prior to the start of the regular season. He then nearly had a contract with the Dallas Cowboys, however the Cowboys changed their mind when Mike Quinn became available. In December 1998, Miller signed with the Chicago Bears, following a season-ending injury to Erik Kramer.

It was not until 1999, in his second year with the Bears, that Miller earned a starting job.  That promising season was cut short for Miller when he became the first quarterback to be suspended by the NFL for violation of its substance abuse policy. Miller contended he did not read the label on an over-the-counter dietary supplement containing the steroid nandrolone, a banned substance under the NFL's drug policy. He was suspended for four games at the end of the 1999 season and lost about $100,000 in pay.

Upon his return, Miller became established as the starter for the Bears' brief playoff run in 2001, their first berth since 1994. With the second-best record in the NFC and tied for the second-best record in the NFL along with the Pittsburgh Steelers at 13–3, the Chicago Bears were awarded a first-round bye. This was due in large part to the Bears top-ranked defense as well as the ball control offense Miller led. On January 19, 2002, the Chicago Bears met the Philadelphia Eagles in the NFC Divisional Playoffs with Miller as quarterback. The Eagles were ahead 6–0 early in the second quarter when Miller threw an interception; during the runback, Eagles' defensive end Hugh Douglas delivered a hit to Miller that resulted in a separated shoulder; Douglas was later fined $35,000 by the NFL. Miller had passed for only 23 yards (3-for-5, with 1 interception) in what was his lone playoff appearance, and Shane Matthews, who replaced Miller for the rest of the game, only passed for 66 yards (8-for-17, with 2 interceptions), as the Bears lost to the Eagles, 33–19.

Miller lost his position as starting quarterback in 2002. Although he did not make a pass attempt thereafter, he received a Super Bowl ring as the backup quarterback for the 2004 New England Patriots. Before the 2005 season, Miller signed with the New York Giants, but was released after having hip surgery and receiving an injury settlement.

Career statistics

WLAF statistics

NFL statistics

Broadcasting career

Miller served as the color commentator for Michigan State football radio broadcasts and hosted the weekly post-game call-in show from 2006 until he took a communications position with the Bears in 2013; he was replaced by Jason Strayhorn. Miller currently serves as a studio analyst on Bears Postgame Live for NBC Sports Chicago, having replaced former Bears legend Richard Dent in 2007. Miller is the current co-host of "Movin' the Chains" along with Pat Kirwan on SiriusXM NFL Radio, Channel 88. Miller and Kirwan are featured as analysts in Longshot, a story mode within Madden NFL 18.

References

Further reading

External links
 Bears Postgame Live video clips at NBC Sports

1971 births
Living people
American football quarterbacks
Michigan State Spartans football players
Pittsburgh Steelers players
Frankfurt Galaxy players
Jacksonville Jaguars players
Atlanta Falcons players
Detroit Lions players
Chicago Bears players
Tampa Bay Buccaneers players
New England Patriots players
New York Giants players
American sports announcers
Players of American football from Michigan
People from Grosse Pointe, Michigan
People from Waterford, Michigan
Ed Block Courage Award recipients